The Carmelite martyrs of Guadalajara were three Spanish Carmelites, María Pilar de San Francisco de Borja, María Ángeles de San José and Teresa del Niño Jesús y de San Juan de la Cruz killed by Republican forces on 24 July 1936 during the Spanish Civil War. 

They were beatified on 29 March 1987 by Pope John Paul II.

References 

20th-century venerated Christians
Martyrs of the Spanish Civil War
Beatifications by Pope John Paul II
Executed Spanish women
Martyred groups